Arthur Lionel Barr-Kemp (6 September 1921 – 25 September 2003) was an Australian rules footballer who played in the VFL from 1943 to 1946 for the Richmond Football Club.

Barr-Kemp's surname was originally 'Kemp', until it was changed to Barr-Kemp later on.

References 
 Hogan P: The Tigers Of Old, Richmond FC, Melbourne 1996
 Death notice: http://www.heavenaddress.com/funeral-notice/Arthur-Lionel--BARR-KEMP/281196/obituary.aspx

External links
 
 

1921 births
Richmond Football Club players
Richmond Football Club Premiership players
Brunswick Football Club players
Australian rules footballers from Victoria (Australia)
2003 deaths
One-time VFL/AFL Premiership players